Anxious People (original title in ) is a novel by Swedish writer Fredrik Backman published by Månpocket in 2019. The novel was published in English in 2021.

It was adapted into a Netflix television series of the same name, which premiered on 29 December 2021.

Plot summary
Ten years ago, a man lost all his savings due to a financial crash. He visited a financial banker named Zara and asked for advice, but she flatly said it was his fault for giving the bank his money. The man wrote a letter to her before taking his own life by jumping off the bridge.

In the present day, a woman tries to rob a bank to get enough money to pay for rent, so her ex-husband won't take her children away. Unfortunately, it is a cashless bank, so she panics and runs to a nearby apartment building to avoid being caught by the police. The bank robber enters an apartment viewing, and the people inside see her pistol and assume that it is a robbery. The bank robber hesitantly accepts that she is taking the people hostage as she tried to maintain order.

The hostages are apartment renovators Anna-Lena and Roger, expecting mothers Julia and Ro, an elderly Estelle, and bank owner Zara. They find a man named Lennart wearing a bunny suit inside the bathroom. Anna-Lena admits that she hired Lennart to cause a commotion to lower the bidding price of other prospective buyers, in order to make Roger believe that he negotiated the price himself. They split up in silence, as Roger had taken pride in his negotiation skills.

Ro follows Roger and admits to him that the reason she nitpicks every apartment her wife Julia brings her to is because she fears she isn't ready to be a parent. Roger assures her that she'll be a good mother and encourages her to buy the apartment. Anna-Lena tells Julia that she fears Roger hates her for deceiving him, but Julia promises her that all couples show their love to their spouses in unconventional ways. A standoffish Zara looks at the bridge from the apartment's balcony and complains about human greed and economic systems to Lennart. When all the hostages regroup, Roger tells Julia that Ro is excited and nervous to be a mother, and Julia tells Roger that he is enough and that Anna-Lena still loves him.

The bank robber apologizes for keeping them hostage and says she will free them and turn herself in. However, the hostages argue that she simply made a mistake to protect her children, and that they all agree to lie in their witness statements to protect her. Estelle reveals that the apartment they're current in is actually her apartment, and that she posed as one of the buyers to sell it to someone who deserved it. She gives the bank robber the key to a neighboring apartment to hide in when the police arrive. The bank robber thanks the hostages for being kind to her.

Jim is the first policer to reach the apartment. The bank robber turns herself in and tells Jim the whole truth of why she robbed the bank. Jim feels sympathy for her and agrees to let her off scot-free. The bank robber releases the hostages and hides in a neighboring apartment. His son Jack interviews the hostages and is frustrated when they play dumb. A series of coincidences lead Jack to believe that the bank robber is still hiding in the apartment, or left pretending to be real estate agent. Jim tells the truth to his son, and they reconcile.

In the end, the bank robber moves in with Estelle in her apartment, and her children are hers every other week. Julia and Ro move into a neighboring apartment and have a baby boy. Anna-Lena and Roger take up a new hobby. Zara starts a relationship with Lennart and works up the courage to read the letter from the man who jumped off the bridge ten years ago. It reads "It wasn't your fault." and she finally lets go of her guilt.

Characters
 Jack — A young police officer who is very dedicated to his job
 Jim — Jack's father, a more lax police officer with many years of experience
 Bank Robber — The perpetrator of the alleged bank robbery and hostage situation
 Zara — A depressed banker who attends apartment viewings for leisure
 Roger — A real estate investor who takes the business very seriously
 Anna-Lena — Roger's wife
 Julia — A young pregnant woman searching for an apartment to raise her family
 Ro — Julia's wife
 Lennart — An actor who is also an apartment viewing disrupter
 Estelle — An older woman who attends the apartment viewing
 Real Estate Agent — The agent responsible for hosting the apartment viewing

Reception 
According to the review aggregator website Book Marks, Anxious People received positive reviews from critics, with four reviews listed as "positive" and four listed as "rave." The Washington Post said that "Backman again captures the messy essence of being human." USA Today described the novel as "about how kindness and compassion count so much in surviving each day – a lesson for our times."

Adaptations
The novel was adapted into a six-part Netflix mini-series, which premiered on 29 December 2021.

References

External links
 Fredrik Backman's Website
 

2019 Swedish novels
Novels set in Sweden
Swedish-language novels
Novels by Fredrik Backman
Bank robbery in fiction